Susan Stewart (born March 15, 1952) is an American poet and literary critic. She is the Avalon Foundation University Professor in the Humanities and Professor of English at Princeton University.

Life
Professor Stewart holds degrees from Dickinson College (B.A. in English and Anthropology), the Johns Hopkins University (M.F.A. in Poetics) and the University of Pennsylvania (Ph.D. in Folklore). 
She teaches the history of poetry, aesthetics, and the philosophy of literature, most recently at Princeton University.

Her poems have appeared in many journals including: The American Poetry Review, The Paris Review, Poetry, Tri-Quarterly, Gettysburg Review, Harper's, Georgia Review, Ploughshares, and Beloit Poetry Journal.

In the late 2000s she collaborated with composer James Primosch on a song cycle commissioned by the Chicago Symphony that premiered in the fall of 2009. She has served on the judging panel of the Wallace Stevens Award on six occasions.

In 2005 Professor Stewart was elected a Chancellor of the Academy of American Poets and a member of the American Academy of Arts and Sciences.

About her work, the poet and critic Allen Grossman has written,

Awards
 Lila Wallace Individual Writer's Award, a Reader's Digest Writer's Award
 two National Endowment for the Arts grants
 1986 Guggenheim Fellowship
 1995 Pew Fellowships in the Arts
 1997 MacArthur Foundation Fellowship
 2003 Christian Gauss Award for Literary Criticism from Phi Beta Kappa, for Poetry and the Fate of the Senses
 2003 National Book Critics Circle award, for Columbarium
 2004 Truman Capote Award for Literary Criticism for Poetry and the Fate of the Senses

Work

Criticism 
 
 
 
 
  a collection of her writings on contemporary art.
  a meditation on what freedom means to the artist.

Poetry

Cinder: New and Selected Poems (2017, Graywolf Press)

Translations

Anthologies

References

External links
Bio and additional info from Pew Fellowship
"Susan Stewart", PennSound
"On the Art of the Future", Slought foundation
Susan Stewart Papers. Yale Collection of American Literature, Beinecke Rare Book and Manuscript Library.

1952 births
Dickinson College alumni
American literary critics
Women literary critics
Living people
MacArthur Fellows
Johns Hopkins University alumni
University of Pennsylvania alumni
Princeton University faculty
Pew Fellows in the Arts
American women poets
American women non-fiction writers
American women academics
21st-century American women
American women critics